Shelly Beach, officially known as Aotea / Shelly Beach, is a settlement and beach located on the eastern side of Te Korowai-o-Te-Tonga Peninsula and the southwest side of Kaipara Harbour, North Auckland. In 2018, a seawall and five groynes were constructed to fight erosion.

Demographics
Shelly Beach is part of the larger South Head statistical area.

Shelly Beach had a population of 252 at the 2018 New Zealand census, an increase of 18 people (7.7%) since the 2013 census, and an increase of 99 people (64.7%) since the 2006 census. There were 105 households, comprising 129 males and 120 females, giving a sex ratio of 1.07 males per female, with 51 people (20.2%) aged under 15 years, 30 (11.9%) aged 15 to 29, 132 (52.4%) aged 30 to 64, and 42 (16.7%) aged 65 or older.

Ethnicities were 91.7% European/Pākehā, 16.7% Māori, 8.3% Pacific peoples, 1.2% Asian, and 1.2% other ethnicities. People may identify with more than one ethnicity.

Although some people chose not to answer the census's question about religious affiliation, 63.1% had no religion, 23.8% were Christian, 1.2% were Muslim and 1.2% had other religions.

Of those at least 15 years old, 21 (10.4%) people had a bachelor's or higher degree, and 39 (19.4%) people had no formal qualifications. 36 people (17.9%) earned over $70,000 compared to 17.2% nationally. The employment status of those at least 15 was that 99 (49.3%) people were employed full-time, 24 (11.9%) were part-time, and 3 (1.5%) were unemployed.

References

Beaches of the Auckland Region
Rodney Local Board Area
Populated places in the Auckland Region
Populated places around the Kaipara Harbour